Nocardioides bigeumensis is a gram-positive bacterium from the genus Nocardioides that has been isolated from farming field soil on Bigeum Island, South Korea.

References

Further reading

External links
Type strain of Nocardioides bigeumensis at BacDive -  the Bacterial Diversity Metadatabase	

bigeumensis
Bacteria described in 2008